Kosmos 423 ( meaning Cosmos 423), known before launch as DS-P1-Yu No.47, was a Soviet satellite which was launched in 1971 as part of the Dnepropetrovsk Sputnik programme. It was a  spacecraft, which was built by the Yuzhnoye Design Bureau, and was used as a radar calibration target for anti-ballistic missile tests.

Launch 
Kosmos 423 was successfully launched into low Earth orbit on 27 May 1971, with the rocket lifting off at 11:59:55 UTC. The launch took place from Site 133/1 at the Plesetsk Cosmodrome, and used a Kosmos-2I 63SM carrier rocket.

Orbit 
Upon reaching orbit, it was assigned its Kosmos designation, and received the International Designator 1971-047A.

Kosmos 423 was the forty-third of seventy nine DS-P1-Yu satellites to be launched, and the thirty-ninth of seventy two to successfully reach orbit. It remained in orbit until it decayed and reentered the atmosphere on 26 November 1971.

See also 

 1971 in spaceflight

References 

1971 in spaceflight
Kosmos satellites
Spacecraft launched in 1971
Dnepropetrovsk Sputnik program